Sandgate railway station is located on the Main Northern line in New South Wales, Australia. It serves the western Newcastle suburb of Sandgate, opening in 1881 as Grant's Creek.

A one kilometre branch diverged behind the station in a north-westerly direction for Sandgate Cemetery. This closed on 13 October 1985. Following the completion of the Sandgate Flyover in November 2006, Sandgate station is flanked by two coal lines on either side.

Platforms & services
Sandgate has two side platforms. It is serviced by NSW TrainLink Hunter Line services travelling between Newcastle, Maitland and Telarah on an hourly basis. It is also service by one early morning service to Scone.

Trackplan

References

External links

Sandgate station details Transport for New South Wales

Railway stations in the Hunter Region
Railway stations in Australia opened in 1881
Regional railway stations in New South Wales
Main North railway line, New South Wales